Andriy Martynyuk (born 23 September 1990) is a Ukrainian male hammer thrower, who won an individual gold medal at the Youth World Championships.

References

External links

1990 births
Living people
Ukrainian male hammer throwers